Marian Michalczik (born 1 February 1997) is a German handball player for TSV Hannover-Burgdorf and the German national team.

He represented Germany at the 2020 European Men's Handball Championship.

References

External links

1997 births
Living people
German male handball players
Handball-Bundesliga players
People from Warendorf (district)
Sportspeople from Münster (region)